The 1857 Minnesota gubernatorial election was held on October 13, 1857 to elect the inaugural governor of Minnesota.

Results

References

1857
Minnesota
gubernatorial
October 1857 events